Commersonia borealis is a species of flowering plant in the family Malvaceae and is endemic to the southwest of Western Australia. It is a low growing, spreading shrub with egg-shaped to oblong leaves, and white, yellow and cream-coloured flowers.

Description
The edges of the leaves have rounded lobes and are rolled under, the lower surface densely covered with white, star-shaped hairs.

Taxonomy
This species was first described in 1904 by Ernst Georg Pritzel who gave it the name Rulingia malvifolia var. borealis in Botanische Jahrbücher für Systematik, Pflanzengeschichte und Pflanzengeographie. In 2005, Carolyn Wilkins raised the variety to species rank as Rulingia borealis in the journal Nuytsia and in 2011 she and Barbara Ann Whitlock transferred the species to the genus Commersonia, resulting in the name, Commersonia borealis. The specific epithet (borealis) means "northern", referring to the distribution of this species.

Distribution and habitat
Commersonia borealis grows in limy sand or loam over limestone in near-coastal shrubland, open woodland or heath between Shark Bay and Seabird north of Perth and on Dirk Hartog Island in the Geraldton Sandplains, Swan Coastal Plain and Yalgoo bioregions of south-western Western Australia.<ref name=FB>{{FloraBase|name=Commersonia borealis|id=40872}}</ref>

Conservation statusCommersonia borealis'' is listed as "not threatened" by the Government of Western Australia Department of Biodiversity, Conservation and Attractions.

References 

borealis
Endemic flora of Western Australia
Rosids of Western Australia
Plants described in 1904
Taxa named by Ernst Pritzel